Nizhny Aradirikh is a rural locality (a selo) in Aradirikhsky Selsoviet, Gumbetovsky District, Republic of Dagestan, Russia. The population was 307 as of 2010. There are 2 streets.

Geography 
Nizhny Aradirikh is located 47 km southeast of Mekhelta (the district's administrative centre) by road. Sredny Aradirikh and Verkhny Aradirikh are the nearest rural localities.

References 

Rural localities in Gumbetovsky District